Wu Pong-fong (2 November 1964 – 25 May 2020) was a Taiwanese actor and choreographer.

Wu was born on 2 November 1964. His father was from Zhao'an County in Fujian. His parents married in 1950 and divorced when Wu was eight years old. He lived with his father in Sanchong District. Despite censorship of Taiwanese Hokkien at the time, Wu heard the dialect at a young age, as many of his classmates spoke it. In time, Wu began identifying as Taiwanese, and not as a Mainlander.

Wu's first acting experience came when he joined a troupe led by Chou Yi-chang. He performed leading roles in Golden Bough Theatre's She is So Lovely (2002) and All in One (2005).

Wu was twice awarded the Golden Bell Award for Best Actor in a Miniseries or Television Film, in 2008 for Imprints Of Ceiba Flowers and 2019 for The Roar. Wu's performance in the film  resulted in a Golden Horse Award for Best Supporting Actor in 2010. He worked with director  a second time in the 2012 film . Wu was cast as Peng Feng in Lin Fu-ching's debut feature film , released later that year.

Wu's relatives found him unresponsive at home in Banqiao District on 24 May 2020. After a forensic medical examination had been performed, Wu's agent confirmed that Wu had died, aged 55, of a stroke in the early morning of 25 May 2020.

References

External links

1964 births
2020 deaths
20th-century Taiwanese male actors
21st-century Taiwanese male actors
Taiwanese male film actors
Taiwanese male television actors
Taiwanese male stage actors
Taiwanese choreographers
Taiwanese male dancers
Male actors from New Taipei